Katherine Victor (born Katena Ktenavea; August 18, 1923 – October 22, 2004) was an American actress, perhaps best known for her roles in Ron Ormond's Mesa of Lost Women (1953) and Jerry Warren films. She was also known as Katina Vea.

Early years 
Victor was born in the Hell's Kitchen, Manhattan, neighborhood of New York City, but she grew up in Los Angeles.

Career 
Victor began acting in the late 1940s, working on stage and on radio. Her film debut came in Mesa of Lost Women (1953).

Victor's work for Warren included Teenage Zombies (1959), Creature of the Walking Dead (1965), House of the Black Death (1965), The Wild World of Batwoman (1966), and Frankenstein Island (1981). She also co-starred in The Cape Canaveral Monsters (1960), directed by Phil Tucker.

During the 1970s, Katherine (who used the film name Kathrin) co-starred in indie filmmaker Brian Pinette's The Centerfold and From Caviar to Coleslaw which was written for her and filmed on location in Houston, Texas.  She recorded two songs for the film From Caviar to Coleslaw: "The Winds of Change" and "Did I Love Too Much?".

Her later films included Bikini Summer (1991), a supporting role in Fugitive Rage (1996), directed by Fred Olen Ray, and a role as Mary Jo Trent in Superguy: Behind the Cape (2004). She also worked in various capacities (generally as continuity director) on a number of Disney animated films and cartoons and productions of other studios.

Personal life

Death
On October 22, 2004, Victor died after suffering a stroke. Her gravesite is at Forest Lawn, Hollywood Hills Cemetery in Los Angeles.

Papers
Victor's papers (1943–2002) are housed at the Margaret Herrick Library in Beverly Hills, California.

References

External links

1923 births
2004 deaths
Burials at Forest Lawn Memorial Park (Hollywood Hills)
20th-century American actresses
Actresses from Los Angeles
21st-century American women